Mukkamala is a village in Ambajipeta mandal of East Godavari district, Andhra Pradesh, India.

Eminent Astrophysicist Appadvedula Lakshmi Narayan, known as A. L. Narayan was born in this village.

Demographics 
The local language is Telugu.

According to Indian census, 2001, the demographic details is as follows:
 Total population: 	2,359 in 560 Households.
 Male population: 	1,189
 Female population: 	1,170
 Children under six-years: 254
 Boys – 125
 Girls – 129
 Total literates: 	1,588

References 

Villages in East Godavari district